The Great Lakes Institute of Management (also known as Great Lakes or GLIM) is a private business school in India. It was founded in 2004 by Bala V. Balachandran, a professor at Kellogg School of Management with its first campus in Chennai. Great Lakes’ second campus started functioning in Gurgaon, Delhi NCR on 2011. Great Lakes offers full-time and executive post graduate programmes in management. Great Lakes offers programs in Marketing, Operations, Finance, Strategy, Data Science, Business Analytics & Cloud Computing. Great Lakes was accredited by AMBA, one of the three main global accreditation bodies. It has two campuses, one on the outskirts of Chennai and one in Gurgaon, Delhi NCR.

The Great Lakes Institute of Management is among the first business schools in India to offer a one year full-time management programme. Its one year Post-Graduate Program in Management (PGPM) became the first one year full-time management programme to be accredited by India’s higher technical education regulator AICTE in 2008.

Currently, at the helm of Great Lake Institute of Management is Dean & Principal Dr Suresh Ramanathan. Dr Suresh has a B. Tech. degree in chemical engineering from Indian Institute of Technology Delhi and an MBA degree from Indian Institute of Management, Calcutta. He has received his Ph.D. from NYU’s Stern School of Business in 2002. Before joining Great Lakes, Dr Suresh was an Associate Professor of Marketing at the prestigious University of Chicago Booth School of Business between 2002 - 2011, and later, Professor of Marketing for close to 8 years at the Mays Business School at Texas A&M University, holding the David R. Norcom’73 Endowed Professorship.

History

Great Lakes was set up in 2004 by Bala Balachandran, J.L. Kellogg Distinguished Professor of Accounting and Information Management at Kellogg School of Management, Northwestern University, USA.

Following the establishment of Indian School of Business (ISB), Balachandran wanted to establish a business school in his home state of Tamil Nadu, and set up the Great Lakes Institute of Management in the capital city of Chennai with a model similar to the ISB involving a one year MBA programme, global visiting faculty and international academic collaborations.

The first intake was for 127 students for its one-year programme and classes were held in a small rented building in Saidapet, a residential neighbourhood in Chennai city.  Great Lakes developed a new greenfield campus at Manamai village near Mahabalipuram, a UNESCO Heritage Site 50 km south of Chennai, and shifted to this campus in 2009.

The regulatory body for technical and management education in India, AICTE, also did not have a provision for approving one-year programmes. However, Great Lakes received approval for its PGPM from AICTE, the first instance of an approval for a one-year programme in the country. While the two-year programmes were categorized as a Post-Graduate Diploma in Management, the one-year programme was categorized as a Post-Graduate Certificate in Management.

Since 2012, Great Lakes has also started offering the traditional two-year PGDM programme.

Accreditation

Great Lakes is accredited by the Association of MBAs (AMBA), UK, one of the three main global accreditation bodies in business education. Great Lakes is the youngest and 7th institute in India to get accreditation from the association. Great Lakes Institute of Management, Chennai is accredited by SAQS (South Asian Quality Assurance System).

Great Lakes’ PGPM and PGDM full-time programmes are approved by All India Council for Technical Education (AICTE), a statutory body for technical education, under Ministry of HRD, Govt. of India. Great Lakes’ Chennai campus is a LEED Platinum Rated Green Campus.

Programs

Full-Time Courses

Post Graduate Program in Management (PGPM) 
This is the Flagship program of Great Lakes Institute of Management. It is a one-year program with rigorous course curriculum. Students applying for this program must have a minimum work experience of two years.

Post Graduate Diploma in Management (PGDM) 
This is a 2-year program designed for young leaders  with less than two years of work experience. It is an AICTE approved program, which has clear focus on emerging economies and their growth.

Executive Education
It is a customized program designed for executives to deliver quantifiable outcomes for their business. Executives from several private and public sectors are given a customized program that helps them with their managerial and leadership skills.

Corporate Programs

Post Graduate Executive Program in Management (PGXPM) 
This program helps executives who has spent a considerable amount of time in the industry. It helps professionals to developing  management competencies and business leadership skills.

Post Graduate Program in Management - Flex (PGPM FLEX) 
The PGPM FLEX program is aimed at working professionals with 2 to 10 years experience. This two-year program helps the executives to pursue the world-class program while giving them the flexibility to continuing their work.

Diploma in Business Analytics 
This program is offered by at the Illinois Institute of Technology, Chicago, in collaboration with Great Lakes Institute of Management, India.

Global diploma For Family Enterprises Management 
The Global Post Graduate Program for Family Enterprise Management is offered in collaboration with Babson College, Massachusetts.

Rankings

Great Lakes Institute of Management was ranked 31 in India by the National Institutional Ranking Framework (NIRF) in the management category in 2022.

See also 

 SMOT – Business School
 Xavier Institute of Management and Entrepreneurship
 Department of Management Studies IIT Madras
 Loyola Institute of Business Administration
 Rajalakshmi Engineering College

References

External links
 

Business schools in Chennai
Educational institutions established in 2004
Private schools in Tamil Nadu
2004 establishments in Tamil Nadu